Anisia Uzeyman (born Anisziya Uwizeyimana February 1975 at Gihindamuyaga in Mbazi, Rwanda) is a Rwandan actress and playwright. She is most noted as codirector with Saul Williams of the 2021 film Neptune Frost.

Filmography

References

External links 
 

Living people
1975 births
Rwandan actresses
Rwandan film directors
Rwandan women film directors